Patrizia Kummer (born 16 October 1987 in Brig) is a Swiss snowboarder.

Kummer won silver in the parallel slalom at the 2013 FIS Snowboarding World Championships, and gold in the Parallel giant slalom at the 2014 Sochi Olympics

References

External links
Profile at FIS-Ski.com

1987 births
Living people
Swiss female snowboarders
Olympic snowboarders of Switzerland
Snowboarders at the 2014 Winter Olympics
Snowboarders at the 2018 Winter Olympics
Snowboarders at the 2022 Winter Olympics
Medalists at the 2014 Winter Olympics
Olympic gold medalists for Switzerland
Olympic medalists in snowboarding
Universiade medalists in snowboarding
Universiade gold medalists for Switzerland
Competitors at the 2015 Winter Universiade
21st-century Swiss women